The 3rd annual Venice International Film Festival was held between 10 August and 1 September 1935. This festival saw the introduction of the Coppa Volpi for the acting awards.

Jury
 Giuseppe Volpi di Misurata (president) (Italy)
 Charles Delac (France)
 Ryszard Ordynski (Poland)
 Fritz Scheuermann (Germany)
 Luis Villani (Hungary)
 Luigi Freddi (Italy)
 Antonio Maraini (Italy)
 Filippo Sacchi (Italy)
 Ottavio Croze (Italy)
 Raffaele Calzini (Italy)
 Gino Damerini (Italy)
 Giovanni Dettori (Italy)
 Eugenio Giovannetti (Italy)
 Mario Gromo (Italy)
 Giacomo Paolucci de Calboli (Italy)
 Elio Zorzi (Italy)

In-Competition films
 Anna Karenina by Clarence Brown
 Becky Sharp by Rouben Mamoulian
 Casta diva by Carmine Gallone
 Crime et châtiment by Pierre Chenal
 Die ewige Maske by Werner Hochbaum
 Episode by Walter Reisch
 La dame aux camélias by Abel Gance, Fernand Rivers
 Sanders of the River by Zoltán Korda
 The Informer by John Ford
 David Copperfield by George Cukor
 The Wedding Night by King Vidor

Awards
 Best Foreign Film: Anna Karenina by Clarence Brown
 Best Italian Film: Casta diva by Carmine Gallone
 Volpi Cup:
 Best Actor: Pierre Blanchar for Crime et châtiment
 Best Actress: Paula Wessely for Episode
 Golden Medal: The Band Concert by Walt Disney
 Special Mention:
 Hermine und die sieben Aufrechten by Frank Wisbar
 Le voyage imprévu by Jean de Limur
 Maria Chapdelaine by Julien Duvivier
 Op hoop van zegen by Alex Benno
 The Private Life of the Gannets by Julian Huxley
 Biennale Cup: Dreams of Love – Liszt (1935 film) by Heinz Hillei
 Best Director: The Wedding Night by King Vidor
 Best Cinematography: The Devil Is a Woman by Josef von Sternberg, Lucien Ballard
 Best Music: Sanders of the River by Mischa Spoliansky
 Best Animation: The Band Concert by Walt Disney
 Jury Special Mention:  by Judah Leman

References

External links 

Venice Film Festival 1935 Awards on IMDb

V
Venice Film Festival
1935 film festivals
Film
August 1935 events
September 1935 events